The Everafter War is the seventh book of The Sisters Grimm series, written by Michael Buckley. It was published in 2009 and then several other books were published.

Plot summary
Goldilocks kisses Henry Grimm, Sabrina and Daphne's father, awakening him from his sleeping spell, but seems to not have worked. Meanwhile, Daphne and Sabrina have been taken by Ms. Smirt, a cruel woman who works in foster care. Luckily, Daphne had made a plan before hand. Puck flies in scaring Ms. Smirt and the entire train. Henry and Veronica (who had waken up by this point), along with the gang, save the girls from Smirt. Henry has a hard time realizing that his daughters have grown up. He is very uncomfortable with their familiarity with magic, remembering how it got his father killed. He decides to disconnect Sabrina and Daphne from Ferryport Landing, forcing them to pack and get ready to return to New York City.

Before they can leave, though, the Scarlet Hand surrounds the house and shoots Uncle Jake in the shoulder. Knowing he needs medical care, Granny sends everyone into the Hall of Wonders, to the Room of Reflections, which contains a number of magic mirrors. They enter what turns out to be a rebel fort, headed by Charming, to fight the Scarlet Hand.  Henry still refuses to stay, so he forces Daphne, Sabrina and Veronica to pack up and leave the fort. They are then cornered by a group of trolls working for the Hand. The trolls attack but Henry and Veronica fight amazingly while the girls watch in awe. After defeating 12 out of the 14, the family is forced to return to Camp Charming. Uncle Jake asks the girls' help in rescuing his love, Briar Rose (Sleeping Beauty), whom he'd bought an engagement ring for. After Uncle Jake is knocked out and Daphne accidentally turns Sabrina into a goose, Briar is rescued, but dragons are sent after the group and Briar dies in the fighting. Sabrina accidentally reveals to Puck that they get married in the future, so they got in a big fight.

Realizing it is time to take a side, the Grimm family, with the exception of Henry, agrees to let Charming's army use various magical weapons in the Hall of Wonders. Nevertheless, the army suffers a grim defeat due to a spy in the camp. Charming sets a trap and discovers Pinocchio is the spy; he was promised he could grow up and become a man.

The girls eavesdrop and discovers that their mother was pregnant when she was put under the sleeping spell. However, the baby was born and was stolen by the Scarlet Hand.

The camp is attacked by the Scarlet Hand and dragons, and everyone retreats into the Hall of Wonders, then leaves to fight again. Left in the house, the Grimms discover that Pinocchio's marionettes are running loose. Sabrina, Daphne, and Puck follow them into the Hall of Wonders where they discover the marionettes have opened a number of rooms in the Hall of Wonders. They lead to the Master, who is their friend, Mirror, who explains that he wants to be a real person, not just a mirror creature. Taking the girls' baby brother, he goes into a secret room that can only be opened by a Grimm and forces Sabrina to open the door. Mirror goes into the Book of Everafter, to rewrite a story and take the baby's body for himself. The girls follow him, only to end up in the Land of Oz, and realize that they have been separated from Puck, Pinocchio, and their brother.

Major characters
 Sabrina Grimm
 Daphne Grimm
 Granny Relda Grimm
 Henry Grimm
 Veronica Grimm
 Uncle Jake
 Mr. Canis
 The Queen of Hearts
 The Sheriff of Nottingham
 Puck (Trickster King)
 Mayor Charming
 Pinocchio
 Snow White
 Mirror
 Briar Rose (Sleeping Beauty)
 Arnold
 Goldilocks

American children's novels
2009 American novels
2009 children's books
Children's fantasy novels
Works based on Grimms' Fairy Tales
Novels based on fairy tales
Amulet Books books